Town and Country Planning Act may refer to:

Town and Country Planning Act 1947 in the United Kingdom
Town and Country Planning Act 1977 in New Zealand
Town and Country Planning Act 1990 in the United Kingdom
Town and Country Planning (Scotland) Act 1997